Last Chance to Dance is an extended play by former Small Faces and Faces keyboardist Ian McLagan, released in 1985 on Barking Dog Records. It is currently available as part of the Here Comes Trouble set from Maniac Records.

Track listing
All tracks composed by Ian McLagan; except where indicated

 "Last Chance to Dance" (McLagan, John Pidgeon) (3:53)
 "All I Want Is You" (3:43)
 "Big Love" (3:32)
 "You're My Girl" (2:37)

 Some cassette versions feature the additional track "I Only Wanna Be With You".

Personnel
 Ian McLagan - vocals, keyboards
 Paul Warren - guitars, bass
 David Kemper - drums
 Phil Chen - bass (1)
Technical
Karat Faye - engineer
 Information taken from the CD booklet for Here Comes Trouble, available from Maniac Records.

1985 EPs
Ian McLagan albums